Beatriz Borges Carneiro (born 7 May, 1998) is a Brazilian Paralympic swimmer who competes in international elite competitions. She competed at the 2020 Summer Paralympics, in Women's 100 metre breaststroke SB14, winning a bronze medal.

Career 
She competed at the 2016 Summer Paralympics in the SB14 100m breaststroke, and the S14 200m freestyle.

She is a triple Parapan American Games medalist and a World silver medalist. She competes in swimming with her twin sister Débora Carneiro.

References

1998 births
Living people
People from Maringá
Paralympic swimmers of Brazil
Swimmers at the 2016 Summer Paralympics
Swimmers at the 2020 Summer Paralympics
Medalists at the 2020 Summer Paralympics
Medalists at the 2019 Parapan American Games
Medalists at the World Para Swimming Championships
Twin sportspeople
Brazilian twins
Brazilian female breaststroke swimmers
Brazilian female medley swimmers
Brazilian female freestyle swimmers
S14-classified Paralympic swimmers
Sportspeople from Paraná (state)
20th-century Brazilian women
21st-century Brazilian women